The Fear of God is the eighth studio album by American band Showbread. The album was released on August 11, 2009 through Tooth & Nail Records. The Fear of God was produced by Sylvia Massy, who had previously produced Showbread's 2004 and 2006 albums No Sir, Nihilism Is Not Practical and Age of Reptiles respectively. According to lead singer Josh Dies, the album is "hard and it's fast and it's chaotic and it's structured and it's catchy and it's melodic and it's emotional and deep and... it's Raw Rock. Straight up, real as ever Raw Rock."

Track listing

Personnel
Josh Dies - Lead vocals, guitar, synthesizer
Mike Jensen - guitar, vocals
Landon Ginnings - guitar, vocals
Patrick Porter - bass, vocals
Jordan Johnson - drums
Rich Veltrop - engineering, additional guitar
Sylvia Massy - mellotron, production

References

External links
The Fear of God on Tooth & Nail

2009 albums
Albums produced by Sylvia Massy
Showbread (band) albums
Tooth & Nail Records albums